WrestleMania 33 was the 33rd annual WrestleMania professional wrestling pay-per-view and livestreaming event produced by WWE. It was held for wrestlers from the promotion's Raw and SmackDown brand divisions. The event took place on April 2, 2017, at Camping World Stadium in Orlando, Florida.  The New Day (Big E, Kofi Kingston, and Xavier Woods) served as the hosts of the event.

Thirteen matches were contested at the event, including three on the Kickoff pre-show. For the first time since WrestleMania 29 in 2013, two world championships were contested: Raw's Universal Championship and SmackDown's WWE Championship; it marked the first time that the Universal Championship, SmackDown Women's Championship, and new Cruiserweight Championship were defended at WrestleMania. In the main event, Roman Reigns defeated The Undertaker in a No Holds Barred match, giving Undertaker his second loss at WrestleMania. Whilst the loss and the events immediately following the main event served to insinuate that The Undertaker had retired, he would return to in-ring competition in 2018 at WrestleMania 34. In the main match for the Raw brand, Brock Lesnar defeated Goldberg to win the Universal Championship, thus becoming the first wrestler to win both the WWE and Universal titles, and in the main match from SmackDown, Randy Orton defeated Bray Wyatt to win his ninth WWE Championship. The event also marked the surprise return of The Hardy Boyz (Jeff Hardy and Matt Hardy), who won the Raw Tag Team Championship. It was also the first WrestleMania to be on the air past midnight Eastern time.

Reception towards the event was mixed, although it was largely considered to be an improvement over WrestleMania 32. Praise was directed towards Styles vs. McMahon, Owens vs. Jericho, the ladder match, Rollins vs. Triple H, and the Universal Championship match. Criticism was reserved for the main event, the WWE Championship match, and the overall length of the show.

Production

Background 
WrestleMania is considered WWE's flagship pay-per-view (PPV) and WWE Network event, having first been held in 1985. It is the longest-running professional wrestling event in history and is held annually between mid-March to mid-April. It was the first of WWE's original four pay-per-views, which includes Royal Rumble, SummerSlam, and Survivor Series, referred to as the "Big Four". The event has been described as the Super Bowl of sports entertainment. WrestleMania 33 was scheduled to be held on April 2, 2017, at Camping World Stadium in Orlando, Florida. The event featured wrestlers from the Raw and SmackDown brands, following the reintroduction of the brand split in July 2016. It was the first WrestleMania to feature the Universal Championship, following its introduction on Raw in July 2016 after the WWE World Heavyweight Championship became exclusive to SmackDown and renamed to WWE Championship. It was also the first WrestleMania to feature the SmackDown Women's Championship and new WWE Cruiserweight Championship.

The event was the third to be held in the state of Florida, after XXIV (at the same venue) and XXVIII. Tickets went on sale on November 18, 2016, with individual tickets costing $38 to $2,130. On October 31, 2016, traveling packages with accommodation ranging from $950 to $5,900 per person were sold. A two-hour Kickoff pre-show preceded the main show, with the second hour broadcast simultaneously on USA Network. On February 20, 2017, The New Day (Big E, Kofi Kingston, and Xavier Woods) of WWE's Raw brand were confirmed to be the hosts of WrestleMania 33.

The four official theme songs for the event were "Greenlight" (by Pitbull feat. Flo Rida and LunchMoney Lewis), "Like a Champion" (by Danger Twins), "Flame" (by Tinashe), and "Am I Savage?" (by Metallica). At the event, Pitbull performed "Options" with Stephen Marley before performing "Greenlight" with Flo Rida and LunchMoney Lewis. American singer Tinashe performed "America the Beautiful" to kick off WrestleMania 33. The pre-show was broadcast on the WWE Network, WWE.com, Facebook, Google+, Pinterest, and YouTube, with USA Network joining the live coverage for the second hour.

Beginning at WrestleMania 32, a match between Big Show and NBA star Shaquille O'Neal had been teased from various media outlets, including WWE. Shaq was a surprise entrant in the 2016 André the Giant Memorial Battle Royal where he and Big Show faced off, but the other participants eliminated both of them. In July at the 2016 ESPY Awards on the red carpet, Show and Shaq had another brief confrontation. A match was proposed for WrestleMania 33, which Shaq accepted. In January 2017, the two began calling each other out on social media, posting workout videos of themselves preparing for the potential match. Big Show then began to doubt Shaq's commitment to the match. By the end of February, Shaq said that it looked like the match was not going to happen, but he would still train just in case. The following week, Shaq said that discussions were back on between him and WWE. However, Big Show's announcement as a participant in the 2017 André the Giant Memorial Battle Royal indicated that the match was off. According to Dave Meltzer of Wrestling Observer Newsletter, the match was canceled due to monetary reasons, as both parties could not agree on a deal. Big Show said that he really wanted to do the match, especially since this would probably be his last WrestleMania and blamed Shaq's weight as a reason for why Shaq backed out.

According to wrestling journalist Dave Meltzer in January 2017, a WrestleMania 33 match between The Undertaker and John Cena was scrapped as Vince McMahon had "a different vision for the show and [was] thinking [about the] longterm picture not short-term."

Since 2014, WWE had attempted to establish Roman Reigns as their top babyface and the next 'face of the company', but a significant portion of fans rejected Reigns in this role, taking issue with his perceived special treatment,  real-life demeanor, wrestling moveset, speaking skills and character presentation. This resulted in Reigns being booed while he wrestled in the main events of WrestleMania 31 and WrestleMania 32. Reigns was even voted as 2016's "Most Hated Wrestler of the Year" by Pro Wrestling Illustrated readers, a first for a heroic character since the award was devised in 1972. In response to the negative reception, Reigns said that there is "possible jealousy" from fans regarding his "major success". In March 2017 before WrestleMania 33, wrestling journalist Dave Meltzer reported that WWE's long term plans ("which obviously could change") leading to WrestleMania 34 was to "once again build for a year and have the big coronation" for Reigns, who would still be a heroic character "between now and then" and beat Brock Lesnar for the Universal Championship "to fully replace John Cena as the lead babyface of the company", while the "idea" for Lesnar's role "for years now" was "to become a monster, be unbeatable, run through everybody, and then lose to Roman Reigns".

Storylines 
The card consisted of thirteen matches, including three on the Kickoff pre-show, that resulted from scripted storylines, where wrestlers portrayed villains, heroes, or less distinguishable characters in scripted events that built tension and culminated in a wrestling match or series of matches, with results predetermined by WWE's writers on the Raw and SmackDown brands. Storylines were produced on WWE's weekly television shows, Monday Night Raw, SmackDown Live, and 205 Live, the latter of which is cruiserweight-exclusive.

Main event 
At the Royal Rumble, The Undertaker was eliminated by Roman Reigns in the titular match. In the ensuing stare down, Reigns exclaimed: "This is my yard now!", a claim Undertaker had made for many years. On the March 6 episode of Raw, The Undertaker attacked Reigns with a chokeslam, and a match between the two was scheduled for WrestleMania 33 in what would become the main event.

World championship matches 

At the Royal Rumble, SmackDown's Randy Orton won his second Royal Rumble match, earning himself a world championship match at WrestleMania 33 for his brand's WWE Championship. At Elimination Chamber, Bray Wyatt won the Elimination Chamber match to become the new WWE Champion. As a devoted Wyatt Family member, Orton relinquished his championship opportunity. SmackDown General Manager Daniel Bryan then scheduled a battle royal to determine Wyatt's WrestleMania challenger; it ended in a draw when both AJ Styles and Luke Harper hit the ground simultaneously. Styles then defeated Harper the following week to earn the title match, but at the conclusion of the episode, Orton restated his intentions to challenge Wyatt for the WWE Championship by appearing at the Wyatt Family compound, where Wyatt Family's matriarch Sister Abigail was buried, and setting the compound ablaze. A number one contender's match between Orton and Styles was scheduled in which Orton won.

At WrestleMania XX in 2004, Goldberg defeated Brock Lesnar in their first match against each other. Both left the company after the event, but Lesnar returned in 2012. After twelve years, Goldberg returned in 2016 and immediately began a feud with Lesnar. He defeated Lesnar at Survivor Series in one minute and twenty-six seconds, and also quickly eliminated him from the Royal Rumble match. The next night on Raw, Lesnar and Paul Heyman appeared and challenged Goldberg to one final match at WrestleMania 33. Goldberg accepted Lesnar's challenge and also challenged Kevin Owens for the Universal Championship at Fastlane, which he won, turning their match into a title match for the Universal title. The following night on Raw, new Universal Champion Goldberg came out but was interrupted by Brock Lesnar and Paul Heyman. Lesnar attempted to shake Goldberg's hand to congratulate him, but Goldberg refused. Heyman then said that Goldberg would be "Brock's bitch" at WrestleMania and Lesnar attacked Goldberg with an F-5. The following week, Lesnar and Heyman gloated about Lesnar's attack on Goldberg. On the final Raw before WrestleMania, Goldberg and Lesnar had one last confrontation where Goldberg speared Lesnar.

Undercard matches 

In 2014, The Shield (Seth Rollins, Dean Ambrose, and Roman Reigns) were involved in a rivalry with Evolution (Triple H, Randy Orton, and Batista). After multiple losses to The Shield and Batista quitting WWE, Triple H recruited Rollins to The Authority. Rollins was the forefront of The Authority and won the WWE World Heavyweight Championship (later renamed WWE Championship) at WrestleMania 31, but was forced to vacate the title in November 2015 due to injury. He returned in mid-2016, and during a fatal four-way for the vacant WWE Universal Championship, Triple H aided Rollins in eliminating Reigns, but then turned on Rollins by attacking him with a "Pedigree," costing Rollins the match. During the first months of 2017, Rollins started a rivalry with Triple H, asking for answers. At NXT TakeOver: San Antonio, Rollins appeared and challenged Triple H to a match, who had Rollins escorted from the building by security. On the January 30 episode of Raw, as Rollins was about to confront Triple H, Samoa Joe attacked Rollins, re-injuring his knee. Rollins was estimated to be out of action for up to eight weeks, but after an attack from Triple H, Rollins signed a contract for a non-sanctioned match with Triple H at WrestleMania 33, which forbid Rollins from suing the WWE if he were to get injured again.

After losing the WWE Championship at Royal Rumble, AJ Styles asked for a rematch, which SmackDown Commissioner Shane McMahon promised if Styles did not win the title back in the Elimination Chamber match. At the event, Bray Wyatt won the championship. Styles received a rematch, but in the form of a triple threat match, also including John Cena, where Wyatt retained. After Randy Orton relinquished his championship opportunity, Styles entered into a number one contender's battle royal, which ended in a draw between him and Luke Harper. After defeating Harper to become the number one contender, Orton restated his intentions to challenge for the title, so McMahon and Daniel Bryan decided that Styles would have to compete in another number one contender's match, this time against Orton, who won. The following week, Styles attacked McMahon and threw him through a car window. Styles was subsequently (kayfabe) fired by Bryan, but at the end of the show, an injured McMahon challenged Styles to a match at WrestleMania 33, which Styles accepted.

In mid-2016, Chris Jericho and Kevin Owens began teaming and assisting each other. Jericho played a part in Owens winning the vacant Universal Championship. Over the next several months, Jericho assisted Owens in retaining his title in various defenses. The two also defeated Roman Reigns in a handicap match, with Jericho winning Reigns' United States Championship. After Owens retained his title at the Royal Rumble, Jericho accepted Goldberg's challenge on Owens' behalf for the Universal Championship at Fastlane, which was made official to the dismay of Owens. Jericho then held a "Festival of Friendship" for Owens, who turned on Jericho and brutally attacked him. In retaliation, Jericho cost Owens his Universal Championship match at Fastlane. Jericho then challenged Owens to a match at WrestleMania 33 and Owens agreed under the condition that it would be for Jericho's United States Championship and Jericho accepted.

At Elimination Chamber, The Miz was eliminated by John Cena in the WWE Championship Elimination Chamber match. Cena then eliminated Miz in the number one contender battle royal, and Miz retaliated by returning and eliminating Cena. Cena was then a guest on Miz TV where Miz criticized Cena for being a hypocrite, as Cena was basically doing the same thing that he himself had criticized The Rock for doing: leaving the WWE and going to Hollywood. Miz said that despite his hard work, he does not get the same opportunities as Cena, and he eliminated Cena to prevent him from going to WrestleMania 33. Cena criticized Miz for copying other people's gimmicks and moves, which caused Maryse to slap Cena for insulting her husband. Cena's girlfriend Nikki Bella then came out and Maryse and Miz retreated. During the following weeks, Miz and Maryse made fun of Cena and Nikki's reality show Total Bellas by impersonating them in "unaired footage". This ultimately led to Daniel Bryan scheduling a mixed tag team match between the two couples at WrestleMania.

At Roadblock: End of the Line, Charlotte Flair defeated Sasha Banks to win her record fourth Raw Women's Championship, ending their long feud and, as per a post-event stipulation, as long as one of them was champion, the other could not challenge for the title. Charlotte then began a feud with Bayley, losing the title against her on the February 13 episode of Raw, thanks to help from Banks. Also during this time, Banks entered into a feud with Nia Jax. Bayley retained the title against Flair at Fastlane after an interference from Banks, who defeated Jax on the Kickoff pre-show. The following weeks, Bayley was defeated by Banks and Jax. Both Flair and Banks touted their reasons why they should challenge Bayley for the title at WrestleMania 33, leading to a triple threat match being scheduled. Jax was then added, turning the match into a fatal four-way elimination match. On Raw, Bayley and Banks teamed up and defeated Flair and Jax. After the match, Jax laid out her three WrestleMania opponents.

On the Royal Rumble Kickoff pre-show, Luke Gallows and Karl Anderson defeated Cesaro and Sheamus to win the Raw Tag Team Championship. Cesaro and Sheamus invoked their rematch, but lost due to interference from Enzo Amore and Big Cass. On the February 20 episode of Raw, Amore and Cass defeated Cesaro and Sheamus to receive a tag title match at Fastlane, where Gallows and Anderson retained. A rematch occurred the following night on Raw where Cesaro and Sheamus got involved, costing Enzo and Cass the titles. Later on, Raw General Manager Mick Foley scheduled Cesaro and Sheamus to face Amore and Cass on the next episode, with the winners going on to challenge Gallows and Anderson for the titles at WrestleMania 33. However, during that match, Gallows and Anderson attacked both teams, causing a double disqualification. Foley then scheduled Gallows and Anderson to defend the titles against both teams at WrestleMania in a triple threat match. The following weeks, Gallows and Anderson attacked the others with a ladder. The WrestleMania match was then turned into a triple threat ladder match for the Raw Tag Team Championship.

At Elimination Chamber, Naomi defeated Alexa Bliss to win the SmackDown Women's Championship, but a legit injury forced her to relinquish the title. Bliss then defeated Becky Lynch for the vacant title. On the March 7 episode of SmackDown, Becky, Natalya, and even Bliss' ally Mickie James all demanded to challenge for the championship at WrestleMania 33. Daniel Bryan decided that Bliss would defend the title against all available female SmackDown wrestlers at WrestleMania. On the final SmackDown before WrestleMania, Naomi returned and confirmed that she would be in the match at WrestleMania, making it a six-pack challenge.

Pre-show matches 
At Elimination Chamber during the WWE Championship Elimination Chamber match, Baron Corbin was eliminated by the Intercontinental Champion Dean Ambrose. Then, Corbin executed the "End of Days" on him before he left the chamber, causing his elimination. During the following weeks, both wrestlers attacked each other, leading to a match at WrestleMania for the Intercontinental title. The match was moved to the Kickoff pre-show.

After retaining the WWE Cruiserweight Championship for several months, Neville said there was no one left in the cruiserweight division that could compete with him. Austin Aries, who had been out of action due to injury, disagreed and attacked Neville. On the March 14 episode of 205 Live, Aries won a fatal five-way elimination match to face Neville for the title on the WrestleMania 33 Kickoff pre-show.

Event

Pre-show 
Three matches were contested on the two-hour long WrestleMania 33 Kickoff pre-show.

In the first match, Neville defended the WWE Cruiserweight Championship against Austin Aries. In the climax, as Aries applied the "Last Chancery" on Neville, Neville poked Aries' eyes to escape and performed a "Red Arrow" on Aries to retain the title.

Next, 33 wrestlers competed in the André the Giant Memorial Battle Royal, including previously unannounced participants Kalisto, Sin Cara, Luke Harper, Titus O'Neil, The Vaudevillains (Simon Gotch and Aiden English) and The Ascension (Konnor and Viktor). In the climax, Jinder Mahal taunted New England Patriots tight end Rob Gronkowski, who was sitting at ringside. This prompted Gronkowski to enter the ring and shove Mahal. Mojo Rawley then eliminated Mahal to win the match.

In the last pre-show match, Dean Ambrose defended the Intercontinental Championship against Baron Corbin. In the end, Corbin attempted the "End of Days" on Ambrose, who countered and performed "Dirty Deeds" on Corbin to retain the title.

Preliminary matches 
The actual pay-per-view opened with the hosts, The New Day (Big E, Kofi Kingston, and Xavier Woods), who were dressed as characters inspired by Final Fantasy XIV: Stormblood, a sponsor of the event. They made their entrance and hyped the live crowd for the event.

In the first match, AJ Styles faced Shane McMahon. During the match, Styles attempted a springboard 450° splash on Shane, who countered into a triangle choke on Styles, who then countered into a one-armed "Styles Clash" on Shane for a near-fall. After the referee was knocked down, Styles attempted a "Coast-to-Coast" on Shane, who countered by attacking Styles with a trash can. Shane then performed a "Coast-to-Coast" into a trash can on Styles for a near-fall. Shane attempted a "Leap of Faith" through an announce table on Styles, who moved and Shane fell through the announce table. As Styles attempted a "Phenomenal Forearm", Shane countered into a float-over DDT on Styles. Shane attempted a shooting star press, but Styles avoided and performed a "Phenomenal Forearm" on Shane to win the match.

Next, Chris Jericho defended the United States Championship against Kevin Owens. Owens attempted a pop-up powerbomb on Jericho, who countered and performed a "Lionsault" on Owens for a near-fall. Owens applied the "Walls of Jericho" on Jericho, who escaped. Owens performed a pop-up powerbomb on Jericho for a near-fall. As Owens attempted a second pop-up powerbomb on Jericho, Jericho countered into a "Codebreaker" on Owens, who touched the ring ropes with one finger to void the pinfall at a two count. In the end, Owens performed a powerbomb on Jericho onto the ring apron and pinned him to win his first United States Championship.

After that, Bayley defended the Raw Women's Championship against Charlotte Flair, Nia Jax and Sasha Banks in a fatal four-way elimination match. Bayley, Flair, and Banks performed a triple powerbomb on Jax and all three pinned Jax to eliminate her. Banks applied the "Bank Statement" on Flair, who escaped and caused Banks to collide with an exposed turnbuckle, after which Flair pinned Banks to eliminate her. In the end, Flair collided with the exposed turnbuckle, allowing Bayley to perform a diving elbow drop on Flair to retain the title.

In the fourth match, Luke Gallows and Karl Anderson were originally scheduled to defend the Raw Tag Team Championship against Cesaro and Sheamus and Enzo Amore and Big Cass in a triple threat ladder match. Before the match, hosts The New Day announced that the returning Hardy Boyz (Jeff Hardy and Matt Hardy) would also be involved in the match. In the end, Matt performed a "Twist of Fate" off a ladder on Anderson and Jeff performed a "Swanton Bomb" off a ladder through a bridged ladder on Cesaro and Sheamus. Matt then retrieved the title belts to win the championship for the first time as a team; individually, the first time for Jeff and the second time for Matt.

Later, John Cena and Nikki Bella faced The Miz and Maryse in a mixed tag team match with Al Roker serving as the special guest ring announcer. In the end, as Bella and Maryse were the legal wrestlers, Cena and Bella performed "Five Knuckle Shuffles" on Miz and Maryse. Cena performed an "Attitude Adjustment" on Miz whilst Bella performed a "Rack Attack 2.0" on Maryse. Cena and Bella pinned both Miz and Maryse to win the match. After the match, Cena proposed to Nikki, who accepted.

Next, Seth Rollins then faced Triple H in a non-sanctioned match. During the match, Rollins attempted a "Pedigree" on Triple H, who countered into a  DDT on Rollins onto an announce table. Triple H targeted Rollins' leg, applying an inverted figure-four leglock on Rollins, who rolled out of the ring to escape the hold. Triple H retrieved his signature sledgehammer, only for Rollins to perform an enzuigiri on Triple H. As Rollins retrieved the sledgehammer, Stephanie McMahon snatched the weapon away from Rollins. This allowed Triple H to perform a "Pedigree" on Rollins for a near-fall. As Triple H attempted a "Pedigree" on Rollins from the top rope, Rollins countered and performed a "Phoenix Splash" on Triple H for a near-fall. After trading counters, Rollins performed a superkick on Triple H, who bumped into Stephanie, causing her to crash through a table. Rollins then performed a "Pedigree" on Triple H to win the match.

Next, Bray Wyatt defended the WWE Championship against Randy Orton. At the beginning of the match, Orton attempted an "RKO" on Wyatt, who rolled out of the ring. During the match, Wyatt played mind games on Orton by having large images of different insects appear on the ring canvas. Outside of the ring, Wyatt performed "Sister Abigail" on Orton into the barricade. Orton then performed an "RKO" on Wyatt and scored a near-fall. Wyatt performed "Sister Abigail" on Orton for a near-fall. Orton then performed another "RKO" on Wyatt to win his ninth WWE Championship and his first at WrestleMania.

After that, Goldberg defended the Universal Championship against Brock Lesnar. Lesnar performed three German suplexes on Goldberg, who quickly recovered and performed two spears on Lesnar, who then rolled out of the ring. Goldberg then performed a spear on Lesnar through the barricade into the timekeeper's area. Goldberg got Lesnar back into the ring and attempted a "Jackhammer", but Lesnar countered and attempted an "F-5" on Goldberg, who also countered and performed another spear, followed by a "Jackhammer" on Lesnar, who became the first man to kick-out of the spear-"Jackhammer" combo. Goldberg attempted the fifth spear, but Lesnar avoided Goldberg with a leapfrog and performed seven more German suplexes on him. Lesnar then performed an "F-5" on Goldberg to win his first Universal Championship and gave Goldberg his first clean singles loss of his career. This win also made Lesnar the first wrestler to win both the WWE Championship and Universal Championship.

In the penultimate match, Alexa Bliss defended the SmackDown Women's Championship against Becky Lynch, Naomi, Mickie James, Natalya, and Carmella in a six-pack challenge. The end came when Naomi forced Bliss to submit to the "Slay-o-Mission" to win her second SmackDown Women's Championship, tying the record.

Main event 
In the main event, the match between The Undertaker and Roman Reigns was revealed to be a No Holds Barred match. Jim Ross returned as a guest commentator. In the ringside, Undertaker threw Reigns to one of the steel steps and performed a Chokeslam on him onto an announce table, who then performed a Spear on Undertaker through another announce table. Undertaker performed a Last Ride on Reigns for a near-fall. Reigns performed two Superman Punches on Undertaker, who attacked Reigns with a chair and performed a Chokeslam on him onto it for a near-fall. Undertaker performed a Tombstone Piledriver on Reigns for a near-fall. As Undertaker attempted a second Tombstone Piledriver, Reigns countered into a Superman Punch for a near-fall. Reigns executed another Spear, but Undertaker applied Hell's Gate, with Reigns managing to escape. Reigns attacked Undertaker with the same chair and performed two Spears, with both scored near-falls. Undertaker attempted his signature sit-up, but suddenly collapsed. After another Spear, Reigns pinned Undertaker to win the match and become the second person to defeat Undertaker at WrestleMania after Brock Lesnar ended The Streak at WrestleMania XXX. After the match, The Undertaker symbolically left his gloves, coat and hat in the center of the ring. In a very rare moment, Undertaker broke character and shared a kiss with his wife Michelle McCool, who was seated in the front row crying. Undertaker walked to the center of the entrance ramp, looked at the crowd and raised his arm, as he was lowered below the stage to the sound of his music and his signature gong sounded three times, as the show ended. In the arena, the main stage lighting (not the crowd's lighting) was left off for the remainder of the evening and Undertaker's clothes were left in the ring, as the production crew cleaned up only taking his clothing articles when it was time to disassemble the ring.

Reception 
WrestleMania 33 received mixed reviews from critics. Matt Geradi and Kevin Pang of The A.V. Club co-reviewed WrestleMania. Pang criticized the event for being "long and exhausting to watch at home", with "nothing that would win match-of-the-year in a 2017 poll" and "minimum" surprises. Geradi felt that the event exceeded his expectations and "the storytelling was on point all night", but it was a "tremendously front-loaded show". Yet Geradi and Pang agreed that everything "didn't matter" as WrestleMania "was about one story—the end of The Undertaker"; both reviewers agreed that the main event was "sad", with Pang also describing it as "ugly". Although "Shawn Michaels' sympathy and expressiveness" made Ric Flair's retirement at WrestleMania "moving and memorable", Geradi chided Reigns for having "barely mustered an ounce of anything other than disbelief and exasperation" as it "was business as usual for The Big Dog". For the other matches, Pang wrote that Aries–Neville fulfilled expectations as the "best technical match" with an "especially killer" finish, while Gerardi described Jericho–Owens as "really solidly worked with some clever, unique spots, and the in-ring story with all the counters was great stuff".

Dave Meltzer of the Wrestling Observer Newsletter described WrestleMania 33 as "a long but extremely newsworthy show" finished off with the "retirement" ceremony for the Undertaker, whose match was "as good as could be expected as they went long". Meltzer described that though the crowd was tired at the finish of the main event, WWE "did clearly turn down the sound" and "then they hit the pyro". For the Universal title match, Meltzer wrote that it "was what was expected" and the "match was pretty much perfect considering how late it was", with the live audience "going nuts through all of this". For McMahon–Styles, Meltzer commented that the "match had its moments that were spectacular", and that the "story was that Shane was the real striker and got the better of that". For Ambrose–Corbin, Meltzer felt it was "certainly a lot less than you'd think for a WrestleMania match", while the Raw women's match was "too short for an elimination match", and the Raw tag team title match "wasn't as good as what  most WrestleMania ladder matches but the crowd went completely nuts for the Hardys". Although WWE "may have turned down the crowd noise" for Cena's proposal, Meltzer felt the proposal was "really great". Lastly, Meltzer said that Rawley winning the battle royal was "largely for the mainstream coverage of Rob Gronkowski".

Jack de Menezes of The Independent wrote that WrestleMania 33 was "an emotional night for fans", especially due to the "brutal ending" of the Undertaker's career. With Reigns' "disappointing, error-strewn display ... compared to some of the other eye-catching displays at WrestleMania", de Menezes questioned if the "obvious passing of the torch by the WWE" was "the right decision". For the other memorable moments of the night, de Menezes described the return of The Hardy Boyz as "incredible and triumphant", the Orton–Wyatt match as a "creepy and disturbing affair", Naomi recapturing the SmackDown women's title as "a homecoming to remember", McMahon–Styles as a match "filled with highlight moments" and Cena's proposal as "unthinkable".

Luis Paez-Pumar of Rolling Stone described WrestleMania as "two-faced as a Gemini"—the first half "was a brisk hybrid of styles and matches that made you think that WWE knew what it was doing all along with this lackluster build", but once Triple H appeared, the rest of the event "was a slog of plodding wrestling, brief matches and boos". Paez-Pumar described that The Undertaker as "should have retired when the Streak was broken", but "lived on to pass the rub onto Reigns in the sloppiest, saddest manner possible". Paez-Pumar proclaimed that "WWE has no idea how to handle Bray Wyatt", writing that Orton "definitely did not need the title" and ridiculing Wyatt's conjuring of "projected video screen grossness" as "the dumbest crap". Paez-Pumar called for "fresh blood or new ideas" in both women's divisions and for Triple H to retire given that he "has not put on a good Mania match" since 2005 or 2006 once WrestleMania XXX was discounted. For the positives, Goldberg–Lesnar was a "revitalizing adrenaline shot to the spine", Cena's proposal was "magic in a way that no other entertainment can match", The New Day "were excellent hosts; funny when called upon and out of the way when not", while "a stale-ass tag team division just became the most must-see part of Raw" due to the return of the Hardys. The match between Orton and Wyatt was voted by The Wrestling Observer Newsletter as the Worst Match of the Year.

In 2020, The Undertaker said during an interview he was disappointed of his performance against Reigns.

Aftermath 
There had been much speculation that Undertaker had competed in his final match. While it was not confirmed on air, the WWE online merchandise store released a commemorative photo plaque showing a photo of Undertaker's gear that he left in the ring, with the description stating that he had ended his in-ring career. In addition, Dave Meltzer of Wrestling Observer reported that Undertaker would be getting surgeries for his injuries, specifically a hip replacement surgery that Undertaker held off due to his commitments with WWE. However, after being challenged to a match at WrestleMania the following year, Undertaker made an impromptu return and defeated John Cena at WrestleMania 34. Undertaker continued to wrestle sporadically over the next couple of years until he had his official final match at WrestleMania 36 where he defeated AJ Styles in a Boneyard match. His retirement ceremony was then held at Survivor Series on November 22, 2020, which also celebrated the 30th anniversary of his WWE debut, which occurred at the 1990 Survivor Series.

Although John Cena had proposed to Nikki Bella at the event with plans to wed the following year, on April 15, 2018, Nikki announced on her Instagram account that she and Cena had ended their six-year-long relationship.

Chris Jericho admitted in 2021 during his appearance on The Broken Skull Sessions that the placement of his match with Kevin Owens was the proverbial straw that broke the camel's back with WWE, making him seek work elsewhere. The original plan for WrestleMania was for Jericho to win the Universal Championship from Owens in the main event, but then Vince McMahon changed his mind. Jericho stated he understood why McMahon changed his mind, but opined that at the very least, his match with Owens should have been first. To have it shunted to the second match of the show meant to Jericho that he was always going to be a "mid-card guy" in WWE and he felt he still had main event potential, so he decided to look for work elsewhere.

Raw 
On the post-WrestleMania 33 Raw the following night, the show opened with "Undertaker" and "Roman sucks" chants from the live audience, which was interrupted by Roman Reigns. After the crowd blasted Reigns with torrid boos and several minutes of hostile chants, Reigns left after only stating, "This is my yard now!" After that segment, WWE commentators labelled the post-WrestleMania 33 crowd as "non-traditional WWE fans" who may cheer for those they normally boo and boo those they normally cheer "all in the name of fun". This echoed similar comments a year prior for the post-WrestleMania 32 crowd, which The A.V. Club described as WWE's "aggressive" and condescending "disclaimers" meant to shame the hardcore audience.

Later, new Universal Champion Brock Lesnar's advocate, Paul Heyman, declared that Goldberg would not be seen again and teased a match between Lesnar and Roman Reigns. Braun Strowman came out and declared that after he himself was done with Reigns, who he had been feuding with prior to WrestleMania, he would be coming for Lesnar and his title. After the show, on Raw Talk, Goldberg stated that his WrestleMania match may have been his last, but hinted that he could return. The following week, Strowman brutally attacked Reigns during a backstage interview and overturned the ambulance that Reigns was in. Afterwards, Reigns was taken to the hospital in another ambulance. A match between the two was scheduled for Payback. Lesnar would hold on to the title for the remainder of the year. At WrestleMania 34, Lesnar and Reigns had a match for the title after it was teased by Heyman over a year ago.

Also on the post-WrestleMania Raw, WWE Chairman Vince McMahon explained that his daughter, Stephanie, would be off television for a while due to her crashing through a table  at WrestleMania, and then introduced 2017 WWE Hall of Fame inductee Kurt Angle as the new Raw General Manager. He also announced that there would be a Superstar Shake-up the following week between Raw and SmackDown, a talent trade between the two brands.

Chris Jericho was granted a rematch for the United States Championship against Kevin Owens at Payback. He was then attacked backstage by Owens and Samoa Joe. Jericho was subsequently replaced in a tag team match by the returning Finn Bálor. On the April 11 episode of SmackDown, the Superstar Shake-up moved Owens to SmackDown, but it was decided that if Jericho won the United States Championship at Payback, he would also move to SmackDown. Also, Seth Rollins resumed his rivalry with Samoa Joe and the two were scheduled to fight at Payback.

Also on the post-WrestleMania Raw, The Hardy Boyz retained their Raw Tag Team Championship against Luke Gallows and Karl Anderson, while Cesaro and Sheamus earned a title shot at Payback by defeating Enzo Amore and Big Cass. The New Day issued an open challenge, which was answered by NXT's The Revival (Scott Dawson and Dash Wilder) in their main roster debut. The Revival defeated and continued to beat down New Day, injuring Kofi Kingston's ankle. The following week, The New Day (Big E and Xavier Woods) lost a rematch against Revival and were moved to SmackDown as part of the Superstar Shake-up.

In the women's division, Raw Women's Champion Bayley, Sasha Banks, and Dana Brooke defeated Charlotte Flair, Nia Jax, and the returning Emma. The following week, Banks was about to challenge Bayley to a title match when she was interrupted by Alexa Bliss and Mickie James, who moved over from SmackDown as a result of the Superstar Shake-up; Charlotte was moved to the SmackDown brand. Bliss subsequently earned a title match at Payback by winning a fatal four-way match.

SmackDown 
On the post-WrestleMania SmackDown, Bray Wyatt challenged the newly-crowned WWE Champion Randy Orton to a "House of Horrors" non-title match, which Orton accepted. In the ensuing brawl, Luke Harper and the returning Erick Rowan came out to help Orton and Wyatt, respectively. Subsequently, Orton and Harper defeated Wyatt and Rowan. Wyatt was moved to Raw the following week and his rematch with Orton was scheduled for the Raw-exclusive pay-per-view, Payback.

Also on the post-WrestleMania SmackDown, SmackDown Commissioner Shane McMahon addressed the Superstar Shake-Up. His WrestleMania opponent, AJ Styles, interrupted him, saying that he wanted to stay on SmackDown, and then shook Shane's hand out of respect. The following week, Styles was confirmed to stay on SmackDown and he defeated Baron Corbin and Sami Zayn, who had moved over from Raw, to become the number one contender for the United States Championship at Backlash.

In a non-title rematch, Baron Corbin defeated Intercontinental Champion Dean Ambrose in a Street Fight. This would be their last encounter as Ambrose, with the championship, moved to the Raw brand as a result of the Superstar Shake-up.

The Miz and Maryse continued their impersonation of John Cena and Nikki Bella. They claimed credit for Cena proposing to Nikki and mocked the newly-engaged couple, as they were taking a break from WWE post-WrestleMania. As they were leaving the ring, they were interrupted by the main roster debut of Shinsuke Nakamura. The Miz and Maryse were then moved to Raw, where they resumed their rivalry with Dean Ambrose. Jinder Mahal moved to SmackDown, where he continued his feud with Mojo Rawley and Rob Gronkowski. Rawley defeated Mahal following interference by Gronkowski. Both Mahal and Rawley then participated in a six-pack challenge, which Mahal won to become the #1 contender for the WWE Championship at Backlash.

In the women's division, Alexa Bliss lost her rematch for the SmackDown Women's Championship against Naomi. The following week, Alexa and Mickie James moved to Raw as a result of the Superstar Shake-up. Charlotte Flair, who moved over from Raw, defeated Naomi in a non-title match to become the number one contender.

205 Live
In the cruiserweight division on the post-WrestleMania 205 Live, Austin Aries earned another title shot by winning a fatal four-way match, and it was scheduled for Payback.

Results

Raw Women's Championship Fatal 4-Way match eliminations

References

External links 

 

WrestleMania
2017 WWE Network events
2017 in professional wrestling in Florida
Professional wrestling shows in Orlando, Florida
2017 WWE pay-per-view events
April 2017 events in the United States